Parle may refer to:

Places
 Vile Parle, a suburb of Mumbai, India
 Parle (Chandgad), a village located in the city of Kolhapur

Companies and products:
 Parle Products, an Indian company
 Parle-G a brand of biscuits manufactured by Parle Products
 Parle Agro, an Indian company that split from Parle Products

Other:
 Luan Parle (21st century), Irish folk singer
 USS Parle (DE-708), a Rudderow class destroyer escort

See also

 Parlay (disambiguation)
 Parley (disambiguation)
 Parler (disambiguation)
 Parly